Them Thar Hills is a 1934 American comedy short film directed by Charley Rogers and starring Stan Laurel and Oliver Hardy. The film was so well received by audiences that producer Hal Roach and Metro-Goldwyn-Mayer made a sequel, Tit for Tat, which was released five months later, in January 1935.

Plot
At the advice of a doctor (Billy Gilbert), Stan and Ollie travel to the mountains in order for Ollie to recover from gout. They park their travel trailer (caravan) near a deserted cabin recently occupied by a gang of moonshiners who had been raided and arrested by Prohibition authorities. Before being captured, the moonshiners tried to get rid of their illegal liquor by pouring two full barrels of it into a nearby well. Stan and Ollie now use that same well as their source for drinking water. While making a pot of coffee with the alcohol-laced water, Stan notices it has “a funny color”, but Ollie tastes it and explains that all mountain water is like that. "It's the iron in it", he says, "it's good for your nerves."

A motorist couple who have run out of petrol arrives and asks for help. While the irritable and overbearing husband (played by familiar nemesis Charlie Hall) walks back to his car with Stan's spare can of petrol, the man's wife (Mae Busch), appreciating the boys' affable and respectful manners as a refreshing relief from her husband's crabby belligerence, willingly joins the boys for supper and ladlefuls of the potent "mountain water". The husband returns with the car to find that the three are all roaring drunk, and his anger at Stan and Ollie triggers a "tit for tat" sequence at the end (which happens to also be the name of the "sequel" film). It culminates with the wrecking of the camper, Hall being tarred with molasses and feathered, and with a toilet-plunger stuck to his forehead. Ollie then jumps into the well because his trousers are on fire. The alcohol in the water detonates, causing Ollie's explosive ejection. He then falls to the ground head first and is left half-buried with only his legs exposed and flailing in the air as the film ends.

Cast
 Stan Laurel as Stan
 Oliver Hardy as Ollie
 Mae Busch as Mrs. Hall
 "Charley" Hall as Mr. Hall
Uncredited
Billy Gilbert as doctor
Richard Alexander as moonshiner
Bobby Dunn as moonshiner
Sam Lufkin as moonshiner
Eddie Baker as officer
Bobby Dunn as officer
Baldwin Cooke as officer

References

External links 
 
 
 

1934 films
1934 comedy films
American black-and-white films
Films directed by Charley Rogers
Laurel and Hardy (film series)
1934 short films
American comedy short films
1930s English-language films
1930s American films